Seselphisis visenda, the Seychelles predatory bush-cricket, is a species of cricket first described by Bolivar in 1912. It is a member of the family Tettigoniidae in the order Orthoptera. It is found in the forests of the islands of Mahé, Silhouette, Praslin and La Digue in the Seychelles.

References

Tettigoniidae
Insects described in 1912